|}

The Cesarewitch Handicap is a flat handicap horse race in Great Britain open to horses aged three years or older. It is run at Newmarket over a distance of 2 miles and 2 furlongs (3,621 metres), and finishes on the Rowley Mile. It is scheduled to take place each year in October.

History
"Cesarewitch" is an anglicised version of Tsesarevich, the title of the heir to the throne in Imperial Russia. The race was named in honour of Tsesarevich Alexander (later Tsar Alexander II), after he donated £300 to the Jockey Club.

The event was established in 1839, and the inaugural running was won by Cruiskeen. It was founded in the same year as another major handicap at Newmarket, the Cambridgeshire. The two races came to be known as the Autumn Double.

The Cesarewitch initially took place before the Cambridgeshire, but the schedule was later reversed and it is now held two weeks after the other race. Three horses completed the double in the 19th century — Rosebery (1876), Foxhall (1881) and Plaisanterie (1885) — but the feat has been rarely attempted since then.

The race was formerly staged during Newmarket's Champions' Day meeting in mid-October and became part of a new fixture called Future Champions Day in 2011. In 2014 the Cesarewitch was separated from Future Champions Day, which was moved back a week in the calendar, and in 2015 it returned to the Saturday of the new Future Champions Festival.

Records

Most successful horse (2 wins):
 Aaim To Prosper - 2010, 2012

Leading jockey (6 wins):
 Doug Smith – Canatrice (1939), French Design (1954), Sandiacre (1957), Come to Daddy (1959), Alcove (1960), Persian Lancer (1966)

Leading trainer (4 wins):
 William Day – Haco (1853), Dulcibella (1860), Thalestris (1864), Foxhall (1881)
 Mathew Dawson – Lioness (1863), Julius (1867), Salvanos (1872), Stone Clink (1886)

Winners since 1974
 Weights given in stones and pounds.

Earlier winners

 1839: Cruiskeen
 1840: Clarion
 1841: Iliona
 1842: Arcanus
 1843: Corranna
 1844: Faugh-a-Ballagh
 1845: The Baron
 1846: Wit's End
 1847: Caurouch
 1848: The Cur, owned by William Stuart Stirling-Crawfurd
 1849: Legerdemain
 1850: Glauca
 1851: Mrs Taft
 1852: Weathergage
 1853: Haco
 1854: Muscovite
 1855: Mr Sykes
 1856: Vengeance
 1857: Prioress 
 1858: Rocket
 1859: Artless
 1860: Dulcibella
 1861: Audrey
 1862: Hartington
 1863: Lioness
 1864: Thalestris
 1865: Salpinctes
 1866: Lecturer
 1867: Julius
 1868: Cecil
 1869: Cherie
 1870: Cardinal York
 1871: Corisande
 1872: Salvanos
 1873: King Lud
 1874: Aventuriere
 1875: Duke of Parma
 1876: Rosebery
 1877: Hilarious
 1878: Jester
 1879: Chippendale
 1880: Robert the Devil
 1881: Foxhall
 1882: Corrie Roy
 1883: Don Juan
 1884: St Gatien
 1885: Plaisanterie
 1886: Stone Clink
 1887: Humewood
 1888: Tenebreuse
 1889: Primrose Day
 1890: Sheen
 1891: Ragimunde
 1892: Burnaby
 1893: Cypria / Red Eyes 
 1894: Childwick
 1895: Rockdove
 1896: St Bris
 1897: Merman
 1898: Chaleureux
 1899: Scintillant
 1900: Clarehaven
 1901: Balsarroch
 1902: Black Sand
 1903: Grey Tick
 1904: Wargrave
 1905: Hammerkop
 1906: Mintagon
 1907: Demure
 1908: Yentoi
 1909: Submit
 1910: Verney
 1911: Willonyx
 1912: Warlingham
 1913: Fiz Yama
 1914: Troubadour
 1915: Son-in-Law
 1916: Sanctum
 1917: Furore
 1918: Air Raid
 1919: Ivanhoe
 1920: Bracket
 1921: Yutoi
 1922: Light Dragoon
 1923: Rose Prince
 1924: Charley's Mount
 1925: Forseti
 1926: Myra Gray
 1927: Eagle's Pride
 1928: Arctic Star
 1929: West Wicklow
 1930: Ut Majeur
 1931: Noble Star
 1932: Nitsichin
 1933: Seminole
 1934: Enfield
 1935: Near Relation
 1936: Fet
 1937: Punch
 1938: Contrevent
 1939: Cantatrice
 1940: Hunter's Moon
 1941: Filator
 1942: no race
 1943: Germanicus
 1944: no race
 1945: Kerry Piper
 1946: Monsieur l'Amiral
 1947: Whiteway
 1948: Woodburn
 1949: Strathspey
 1950: Above Board
 1951: Three Cheers
 1952: Flush Royal
 1953: Chantry
 1954: French Design
 1955: Curry
 1956: Prelone
 1957: Sandiacre
 1958: Morecambe
 1959: Come to Daddy
 1960: Alcove
 1961: Avon's Pride
 1962: Golden Fire
 1963: Utrillo
 1964: Grey of Falloden
 1965: Mintmaster
 1966: Persian Lancer
 1967: Boismoss
 1968: Major Rose
 1969: Floridian
 1970: Scoria
 1971: Orosio
 1972: Cider with Rosie
 1973: Flash Imp

See also
 Horse racing in Great Britain
 List of British flat horse races

Notes

References
 Paris-Turf:
 Racing Post:

 galopp-sieger.de – Cesarewitch Handicap.
 pedigreequery.com – Cesarewitch Handicap – Newmarket.
 tbheritage.com – Cesarewitch Stakes (Handicap).
 
 Race Recordings 

Flat races in Great Britain
Newmarket Racecourse
Open long distance horse races
Recurring sporting events established in 1839
1839 establishments in England